The Gulag was the government agency that administered the penal labor camps of the Soviet Union.

Gulag may also refer to:

 Gulag (film), 1985 film by Roger Young starring David Keith
 Gulag, Iran, a village in South Khorasan Province, Iran
 Gulag: A History, a book by Anne Applebaum

See also
 
 Goolag (disambiguation)
 Kulak (disambiguation)